Lawrence "Larry" Hollenbeck (April 9, 1949 – October 8, 2020) was a professional stock car racing driver residing in Kalamazoo, Michigan, where he designed, built and leased residential and commercial properties for 35 years.  He had five Busch Series starts to his credit and fielded the #71 S.W.A.T. Fitness Chevy in the ARCA RE/MAX Series.

Racing career
Hollenbeck’s race career began at the age of 18 at the local drag strip. He had also raced in snowmobiles, and spent a decade racing APBA-sanctioned powerboats offshore, and 3 years at oval tracks racing go-carts.

His stock car career began at a short track in Florida, then he moved on to the ARCA series. In his first race with ARCA he finished in the top 10 at Winchester Speedway in 2001. In 2002, Hollenbeck received his NASCAR Busch license. Hollenbeck ran his first NASCAR Busch series race in Talladega on April 5, 2003, where he finished 15th.

In 2004 and 2005 Hollenbeck ran in select Busch races. It was also during this time that Hollenbeck attempted several Nextel Cup races, failing to qualify at Michigan and Atlanta in 2004.

In 2008 Hollenbeck raced in several ARCA races. In the fall race at Talladega he qualified well for the race and had sponsorship from www.boyshomeinc.org.

At the 2009 Lucas Oil Slick Mist 200, Hollenbeck and Patrick Sheltra suffered minor injuries when Hollenbeck T-boned him at about 165 miles per hour. Both were released from the hospital three days later.

Personal life
Hollenbeck died on October 8, 2020.

Motorsports career results

NASCAR
(key) (Bold – Pole position awarded by qualifying time. Italics – Pole position earned by points standings or practice time. * – Most laps led.)

Nextel Cup Series

Busch Series

ARCA Re/Max Series
(key) (Bold – Pole position awarded by qualifying time. Italics – Pole position earned by points standings or practice time. * – Most laps led.)

References

External links
 
 S.W.A.T. Racing

ARCA Menards Series drivers
NASCAR drivers
NASCAR team owners
Sportspeople from Kalamazoo, Michigan
Racing drivers from Michigan
1949 births

2020 deaths